Arvin Otis Arnold (January 24, 1878 – September 11, 1941) was an American businessman and politician.

Biography
Arnold was born near Bigneck, Illinois, He graduated from Maplewood High School in Camp Point, Illinois. He was the owner of the Arnold Printery Company in Quincy, Illinois. Arnold served in the Illinois House of Representatives from 1919 to 1929. He was a Republican. Arnold then served in the Illinois Senate in 1941. He died while still in office. Arnold died at a hospital in Quincy, Illinois after suffering a cerebral hemorrhage while working at his printing plant.

References

External links

1878 births
1941 deaths
People from Adams County, Illinois
Businesspeople from Illinois
American printers
Republican Party members of the Illinois House of Representatives
Republican Party Illinois state senators